Aspergillus arcoverdensis is a species of fungus in the genus Aspergillus. It is from the Fumigati section. The species was first described in 2015.

Growth and morphology

A. arcoverdensis has been cultivated on both Czapek yeast extract agar (CYA) plates and Malt Extract Agar Oxoid® (MEAOX) plates. The growth morphology of the colonies can be seen in the pictures below.

References 

arcoverdensis
Fungi described in 2015